Dejan Iliev (born 25 February 1995) is a Macedonian professional footballer who plays as a goalkeeper for Veikkausliiga side HJK.

Career

Early life
Iliev was born in Strumica, Macedonia and first played youth club football for his hometown club of FK Belasica. He was spotted by Arsenal scouts and signed to join their academy in London in 2012.

Arsenal
Iliev joined the Arsenal Academy immediately upon signing the youth contract. He signed a three-year contract extension from March 2015 until June 2018, when he signed another extension. Iliev appeared three times in the Arsenal squad as an unused substitute: against Norwich in the Carabao Cup in October 2017; and twice in the UEFA Europa League: against Qarabağ and against Chelsea in the final as the third goalkeeper.

Iliev's contract with the club was terminated in January 2022 by mutual consent.

Loan to Sereď
In July 2019, he moved to ŠKF Sereď for a one-year loan, and on the 22nd of the same month he made his debut for his new club in the 2–0 loss to Spartak Trnava.

Loan to Jagiellonia Białystok
After an early end to his loan with ŠKF Sereď, Iliev opted to join Polish Ekstraklasa club Jagiellonia Białystok for the remainder of the 2019–20 season. He made four appearances after suffering an injury.

Loan to Shrewsbury Town
On 8 October 2020, Iliev joined League One side Shrewsbury Town on a short-term loan deal. On 28 January 2021, he returned to Arsenal.

Second loan to Sereď
On 26 July 2021, Arsenal announced that Iliev had returned to ŠKF Sereď on a season-long loan deal.

AS Trenčín
On 7 February 2022, Iliev signed a one-and-a-half-year contract with Fortuna Liga club AS Trenčín. He made his debut in goal on 30 April in a 5–2 victory against Tatran Liptovský Mikuláš.

International career
Iliev has appeared for Macedonia's under-19 and under-21 teams a total of ten times. He has been called up to the senior squad and made the bench ten times.

Career statistics

Honours
Arsenal
UEFA Europa League runner-up: 2018–19

References

1995 births
Living people
Sportspeople from Strumica
Macedonian footballers
North Macedonia youth international footballers
North Macedonia under-21 international footballers
Association football goalkeepers
Arsenal F.C. players
ŠKF Sereď players
AS Trenčín players
Jagiellonia Białystok players
Shrewsbury Town F.C. players
Slovak Super Liga players
Ekstraklasa players
Macedonian expatriate footballers
Expatriate footballers in England
Expatriate footballers in Poland
Expatriate footballers in Slovakia
Macedonian expatriate sportspeople in England
Macedonian expatriate sportspeople in Poland
Macedonian expatriate sportspeople in Slovakia
North Macedonia international footballers